Dune Acres was a South Shore Line flag stop located at Mineral Springs Road serving Dune Acres in Porter County, Indiana. The station opened prior to 1910 and closed in 1994, as part of an NICTD service revision which also saw the closure of Ambridge, Kemil Road, Willard Avenue, LaLumiere, Rolling Prairie, and New Carlisle. The station did not close on July 5, 1994, like the other stations, instead closing after parking was expanded at the Dune Park station.

References

Former South Shore Line stations
Former railway stations in Indiana
Railway stations in Porter County, Indiana
Railway stations closed in 1994